Yudelkys Bautista (born December 5, 1974 in Santo Domingo) is a retired volleyball player from the Dominican Republic. She competed at the 2004 Summer Olympics in Athens, Greece, wearing the number #3 jersey. There, she ended up in eleventh place with the Dominican Republic women's national team. Bautista played as a middle-blocker.

Career
Bautista won the gold medal with the national squad at the 2003 Pan American Games and was selected the "Most Valuable Player". For her 2003 performance, she was also named the 2003 Dominican Republic "Volleyball Player of the Year".

Bautista won the silver medal and the "Most Valuable Player" award at the 2005 Pan-American Cup, held in Santo Domingo, Dominican Republic.

Clubs
  Rio Marsì Palermo (1999–2000)
  Tenerife Marichal (2002–2003)
  Mirador (2000–2004)
  Kab Holding Sassuolo (2003–2004)
  Volley Modena (2004–2005)
  Hotel Cantur Las Palmas (2005–2006)
  Modeca (2005)

Awards

Individuals
 2003 Pan-American Games "Most Valuable Player"
 2003 Dominican Republic "Volleyball Player of the Year"
 2005 Pan-American Cup "Most Valuable Player"

Clubs
 2002 Spanish Supercopa –  Champion, with Tenerife Marichal
 2003 Spanish Queen Cup –  Champion, with Tenerife Marichal
 2003 Spanish Superliga –  Champion, with Tenerife Marichal
 2005 Spanish Supercopa –  Runner-Up, with Hotel Cantur
 2006 Spanish Superliga –  Runner-Up, with Hotel Cantur
 2006 Spanish Queen Cup –  Runner-Up, with Hotel Cantur

References

External links
 FIVB profile
 CEV profile
 Italian League profile

1974 births
Living people
Dominican Republic women's volleyball players
Volleyball players at the 2004 Summer Olympics
Olympic volleyball players of the Dominican Republic
Volleyball players at the 2003 Pan American Games
Pan American Games gold medalists for the Dominican Republic
Pan American Games medalists in volleyball
Central American and Caribbean Games gold medalists for the Dominican Republic
Central American and Caribbean Games silver medalists for the Dominican Republic
Competitors at the 1998 Central American and Caribbean Games
Competitors at the 2002 Central American and Caribbean Games
Middle blockers
Dominican Republic expatriates in Italy
Dominican Republic expatriate sportspeople in Spain
Expatriate volleyball players in Italy
Expatriate volleyball players in Spain
Central American and Caribbean Games medalists in volleyball
Medalists at the 2003 Pan American Games